The Royal Naval Sailing Association (RNSA) is the governing body that oversees all aspects of sailing, both racing and recreational sailing cruises, throughout the British Royal Navy. The RNSA is also the advisor to the Navy Board on sailing matters and administers the Bosun dinghy as a one-design sailing class.

The Royal Naval Sailing Association was founded in 1935, four years before the outbreak of the Second World War. Their headquarters are in Gosport, Hampshire, England.

The aims of the Royal Naval Sailing Association are:
To encourage and organise sailing and cruising throughout the Royal Navy, and amongst the many members who have left the Service.
To stimulate the design and construction of craft suitable for members.
To organise Branches and Units throughout the Service (Naval Air, British Columbia, Clyde, Dartmouth, East Coast, Forth, Fleet, Medway, Plymouth, Portland, Portsmouth, Royal Marines and Royal Australian Naval Sailing Association).
To encourage and promote liaison with other sailing organisations.
To organise and maintain berthing facilities for members wherever possible.
To co-ordinate racing within and outside the Service.
To administer the Bosun dinghy as a one-design class.

References

External links
RNSA Homepage - Official site

1935 establishments in the United Kingdom
Gosport
Organisations based in Hampshire
Royal Navy
Sports clubs in Hampshire
Sports organizations established in 1935
Yacht clubs in England
Yachting associations